Zagheh-ye Akbarabad (also Romanized as Zāgheh-ye Akbarābād; also known as Zāgheh) is a village in Malmir Rural District, Sarband District, Shazand County, Markazi Province, Iran. At the 2006 census, its population was 104, in 23 families.

References 

Populated places in Shazand County